Christophe Colomb Avenue (officially in ) is a major north-south street in Montreal, Quebec, Canada. The street is predominantly residential south of Villeray Street and is a large urban boulevard to the north.

The street was named after Christopher Columbus on December 20, 1897.

Christophe Colomb Avenue begins at Rachel Street, near Lafontaine Park in the south. It is an extension of Parc Lafontaine Street. It is interrupted by Sir Wilfrid Laurier Park between Laurier Avenue and Saint Grégoire Street for distance of 400 metres. In the north, the street ends at Gouin Boulevard, near Louis Hébert Park and the Rivière des Prairies.

Points of interest
La Fontaine Park
Sir Wilfrid Laurier Park
Église Saint-Arsène
Patro Le Prevost, sports and recreation centre
Villeray Park
Complexe sportif Claude-Robillard
Boisé de Saint-Sulpice

Streets in Montreal
Le Plateau-Mont-Royal
Rosemont–La Petite-Patrie
Villeray–Saint-Michel–Parc-Extension
Ahuntsic-Cartierville